Allan H. Kittleman (born October 20, 1958), an American Republican politician, was the ninth county executive for Howard County, Maryland, from 2014 to 2018, and is seeking the office again in 2022. Kittleman previously served as a Maryland State Senator from 2004 to 2014, representing the 9th district covering Howard and Carroll Counties, and was Senate Minority Leader from 2008 to 2011. He also previously served on the Howard County Council from 1998 to 2004.

Education
Born on October 20, 1958, in Olney, Maryland, Kittleman attended Atholton High School in Howard County, Maryland.

Career
Kittleman was admitted to the Maryland Bar in 1988 and was an associate with Smith, Somerville & Case, 1988–1991 (legal assistant, 1984–1988) and a partner with Herwig & Humphreys, LLP from 1996 to 2003 (associate, 1991–1996). Kittleman has worked for the law firm Godwin, Erlandson, MacLaughlin, Vernon & Daney since 2008.

Maryland Senate
He is the son of the late Robert H. Kittleman and was appointed by Governor Bob Ehrlich (R) to fill his seat in the Maryland Senate. In 2006, Kittleman won re-election against Democrat Richard Corkran. He has a reputation as a social libertarian. In 2010, Senator Kittleman defeated Jim Adams by a wide margin in the general election after facing no primary opposition. On January 30, 2010, the Senate Republican Caucus again chose him to serve as Minority Leader with Senator David R. Brinkley as Minority Whip, who defeated Senator Nancy Jacobs.

Senator Kittleman resigned as Minority Leader on January 18, 2011. During the 2011 General Assembly session, he was the only Republican in the Maryland State senate to speak in favor of or vote for a failed bill seeking to legalize same sex marriage.

County Executive
Kittleman was elected County Executive of Howard County, defeating Councilwoman Courtney Watson in the 2014 election. Kittleman's declared priorities as executive included improving the delivery of human services, closing the education gap and rebuilding infrastructure throughout Howard County.

Kittleman spent $1.1 million on school site security, including $800,000 for hiring three school resource officers and a supervisor for them.

He created and later expanded the "Achieve 24/7 initiative" which provided small grants to support mental health support and racial equity resources in schools.

Kittleman helped develop a draft proposal which suggested making zoning changes and architectural updates to the Long Reach Village Center.

Kittleman increased the county operating budget by 15.5% from about $1.4 billion to $1.6 billion over the course of his term, and his budgets passed unanimously each year in the 4–1 majority Democratic County Council.
Kittleman brought many projects to completion that had been discussed for decades but never addressed, including a new Howard County Circuit Courthouse, expansion of MD Rt 32, establishment of a Community Resources Campus, improvements to a pedestrian bridge over Route 29, and purchase of a $23.1 million plot of land intended for a new high school.

Controversial measures undertaken by his administration include reassessing the sustainable growth tier structure of the county in order to change which farmland was required to be in an agricultural preservation program. The structure was put in place in 2012 by County Executive Ken Ulman in 2013. On February 9, 2017, Kittleman vetoed a bill passed three days earlier by the County Council on a 3–2 vote to declare Howard County a sanctuary jurisdiction for illegal immigrants. He said that the bill was unnecessary because he knew of no complaints of unfair treatment due to immigration status.

Democratic County Councilman Calvin Ball III defeated Kittleman in the November 2018 election for County Executive. Kittleman said he was disappointed though he accepted the voters' decision and would seek to help Ball's transition.

Later career 
Following his election defeat in 2018, Kittleman was appointed to the Maryland Worker's Compensation Commission by Governor Larry Hogan.

In September 2021, Kittleman announced he would run for County Executive of Howard County in the 2022 election. He cited community division and taxes as key issues for his campaign.

Kittleman sought and received campaign contributions from the Citizen's Election Fund, a tax-funded government program that provides money to candidates and bars them from accepting donations from businesses, PACs, or special interest groups. 2022 is the first year a local public campaign finance program was available. Kittleman had previously opposed the creation of the Citizen's Election Fund.

Kittleman lost to incumbent county executive Calvin Ball III in the general election on November 8, 2022, and conceded to Ball the following day.

Election results

2022 race for Howard County Executive
{| class="wikitable"
|-
!Name
!Votes
!Percent
!Outcome
|-
|-
|Allan H. Kittleman, Rep.
|53,162
|  40.81%
|   Lost
|-
|-
|Calvin Ball III, Dem.
|76,947
|  59.07%
|   Won
|-
|Other write-ins
|162
|  0.12%
|   Lost
|}

2018 race for Howard County Executive
{| class="wikitable"
|-
!Name
!Votes
!Percent
!Outcome
|-
|-
|Allan H. Kittleman, Rep.
|67,457
|  47.1%
|   Lost
|-
|-
|Calvin Ball III, Dem.
|75,566
|  52.8%
|   Won
|-
|Other write-ins
|124
|  0.1%
|   Lost
|}

2014 race for Howard County Executive
{| class="wikitable"
|-
!Name
!Votes
!Percent
!Outcome
|-
|-
|Allan H. Kittleman, Rep.
|53,207
|  51.2%
|   Won
|-
|-
|Courtney Watson, Dem.
|50,543
|  48.7%
|   Lost
|-
|Other write-ins
|101
|  0.1%
|   Lost
|}

2010 race for Maryland State Senate – District 9
{| class="wikitable"
|-
!Name
!Votes
!Percent
!Outcome
|-
|-
|Allan H. Kittleman, Rep.
|36,641
|  67%
|   Won
|-
|-
|Jim Adams, Dem.
|18,198
|  33%
|   Lost
|-
|Other write-ins
|60
|  0.11%
|   Lost
|}

2006 race for Maryland State Senate – District 9
{| class="wikitable"
|-
!Name
!Votes
!Percent
!Outcome
|-
|-
|Allan H. Kittleman, Rep.
|33,317
|  62.2%
|   Won
|-
|-
|Rich Corkran, Dem.
|20,232
|  37.8%
|   Lost
|-
|Other write-ins
|33
|  0.1%
|   Lost
|}

References

External links
 Allan Kittleman for Howard County Executive (official website)

1958 births
Living people
Republican Party Maryland state senators
People from Olney, Maryland
Atholton High School alumni
University of Maryland, Baltimore County alumni
University of Maryland Francis King Carey School of Law alumni
People from West Friendship, Maryland
21st-century American politicians
Howard County Executives